Bhagtal is a village of Talagang, Chakwal District in Punjab, Pakistan, located 25 km from Talagang city on Talagang-Miawali Road. It resides a population of approximately 15,000. The people are generally government servants and farmers by profession. Majority of the population is Awan by caste.

Language
Punjabi is the main language of Bhagtal.

References

Chakwal District
Populated places in Chakwal District